The Class A4 is a class of streamlined 4-6-2 steam locomotive designed by Nigel Gresley for the London and North Eastern Railway in 1935. Their streamlined design gave them high-speed capability as well as making them instantly recognisable, and one of the class, 4468 Mallard, holds the world record as the fastest steam locomotive. Thirty-five of the class were built to haul express passenger trains on the East Coast Main Line route from London Kings Cross via York to Newcastle, and later via Newcastle to Edinburgh, Scotland. They remained in service on the East Coast Main Line until the early 1960s when they were replaced by Deltic diesel locomotives; they themselves proving to be worthy successors to the A4s. Several A4s saw out their remaining days until 1966 in Scotland, particularly on the Aberdeen – Glasgow express trains, for which they were used to improve the timing from 3.5 to 3 hours.

Overview 
Gresley introduced the Class A4 locomotives in 1935 to haul streamlined Silver Jubilee trains between London King's Cross and Newcastle. The service was named in celebration of the 25th year of King George V's reign.

During a visit to Germany in 1933, Gresley had been inspired by high-speed streamlined Flying Hamburger diesel trains. The London and North Eastern Railway (LNER) had considered purchasing similar trains for use from London to Newcastle but the diesel units of the time did not have sufficient passenger carrying capacity and the capital investment in the new technology was prohibitive.

Gresley was sure that steam could do equally well with a decent fare-paying load behind the locomotive. Initially four locomotives were built, all with the word 'silver' in their names. The first was 2509 Silver Link, followed by 2510 Quicksilver, 2511 Silver King and 2512 Silver Fox.

Following the commercial success of the Silver Jubilee train, other streamlined services were introduced: The Coronation (London-Edinburgh, July 1937) and the West Riding Limited (Bradford & Leeds-London & return, November 1937) for which more A4s were built.

Design
The A4 Pacifics were designed for high-speed passenger services. The application of internal streamlining to the steam circuit, higher boiler pressure and the extension of the firebox to form a combustion chamber all contributed to a more efficient locomotive than the A3; consumption of coal and water were reduced. A further design improvement was fitting a Kylchap double-chimney, first on 4468 Mallard in March 1938.  The double-chimney improved the capability of the locomotives further, and the last three locomotives of the class (4901 Capercaillie, 4902 Seagull and 4903 Peregrine) were fitted with the Kylchap exhaust from new and the rest of the class acquired it in the late 1950s.

The class was noted for its streamlined design, which not only improved its aerodynamics, increasing its speed capabilities, but also created an updraught to lift smoke away from the driver's line of vision, a problem inherent in many steam locomotives particularly those operated with short cut off valve events; fitting smoke deflectors was an alternative solution. The distinctive design made it a particularly attractive subject for artists, photographers and film-makers. The A4 Class locomotives were known by train spotters as "streaks".

The streamlining side skirts (valances) designed by Oliver Bulleid to aerofoil shape that were fitted to all the A4 locomotives, were removed during the Second World War to improve access to the valve gear for maintenance and were not replaced. This apart, the A4 was one of few streamlined steam locomotive designs in the world to retain its casing throughout its existence. Many similar designs, including the contemporary Coronation Class, had their streamlining removed or cancelled to cut costs, simplify maintenance and increase driver visibility.

World record

Gresley never accepted it as the record-breaking maximum. He claimed this speed could only have been attained over a few yards, though he was comfortable that the German speed record of  had been surpassed. Close analysis of the dynamometer roll (currently at the NRM) of the record run confirms that Mallards speed did in fact exceed that of the German BR 05 002. The Mallard record reached its maximum speed on a downhill run and failed technically in due course, whereas 05 002's journey was on level grade and the engine did not yet seem to be at its limit. On the other hand, the German train was four coaches long (197 tons), but Mallard's train had seven coaches (240 tons).
One fact, often ignored when considering rival claims, is that Gresley and the LNER had just one serious attempt at the record, which was far from a perfect run with a 15 mph permanent way check just north of Grantham; despite this a record was set. Gresley planned another attempt in September 1939, but was prevented by the outbreak of World War II. Prior to the record run on 3 July 1938, it was calculated that  was possible; Driver Duddington and LNER Inspector Sid Jenkins both said they might well have achieved this figure had they not had to slow for the Essendine junctions.

At the end of Mallard'''s record run, the middle big end (part of the motion for the inside cylinder) ran hot (indicated by the bursting of a heat-sensitive "stink bomb" placed in the bearing for warning purposes), the bearing metal had melted and the locomotive had to stop at Peterborough rather than continue to London. Deficiencies in the alignment of the Gresley-Holcroft derived motion meant that the inside cylinder of the A4 did more work at high speed than the two outside cylinders – on at least one occasion this led to the middle big end wearing to such an extent that the increased piston travel knocked the ends off the middle cylinder – and this overloading was mostly responsible for the failure.

 Performance in service 
No other British steam locomotives have a longer or more consistent record of high speed running than the A4s. Instances of 100 mph running by them must exceed those of all other types combined, though 90 mph running was a relatively rare event with steam traction, much less 100 mph. It should also be remembered that A4s operated on the East Coast Main Line which has more opportunities for high speed running (particularly Stoke Bank) than any other in the UK.

The fastest recorded post-war speed with British steam was also recorded by an A4. This occurred on 23 May 1959 on the Stephenson Locomotive Society Golden Jubilee special when 60007 Sir Nigel Gresley achieved 112 mph when hauling 400 tons down Stoke Bank. The driver, Bill Hoole, had hoped for an attempt to beat Mallard's record but Alan Pegler, who was on the footplate and mindful of the risks, told him to ease off.

Although A4s were primarily designed for high speed express work they were also capable of high power outputs. In 1940, 4901 Capercaillie exerted 2,200 drawbar horsepower on the straight and level track north of York when hauling 21 coaches (730 tons gross) at an average of 75.9 mph for 25 miles. On W.A. Tuplin's method for grading steam locomotive performance based on both power output and duration of effort, this was the highest value ever achieved by any British locomotive, at Grade 26.

The highest recorded power output from an A4 was 2,450 drawbar horsepower when Mallard herself was hauling 11 coaches (390 tons tare, 415 tons gross) up Stoke Bank at a sustained 80 mph in 1963. O.S. Nock thought this performance superior to Mallard's world record run in 1938. An A4 with the same load on a "good run" would be doing about 50 to 60 mph at the summit of Stoke Bank. On a run on 8 September 1961 Mallard had its train travelling at 78 mph.

Post-war history

Although newer Pacifics had been introduced since the war and the streamlined locomotives were never reinstated, the A4s continued on top link duties, notably on the London to Edinburgh services.

Even after the war was over, the A4s still continued to perform non-stop services. In August 1948, 60028 Walter K. Whigham managed to perform a non-stop service run from King's Cross to Edinburgh, setting the record for distance travelled for 408.65 miles. It would hold this record until 4472 Flying Scotsmans visit to Australia in 1988.

Improved methods of aligning the Gresley conjugated valve gear in the 1950s led to tighter tolerances for the bearings used within it and, consequently, to almost total eradication of the overloading of the middle cylinder. History repeated itself with the inside big end being replaced by one of the Great Western type, after which there was no more trouble, provided that maintenance routines were respected.

The wholesale application of double Kylchap chimneys to the entire class was entirely due to the persistence of P. N. Townend, the Assistant Motive Power Superintendent at King's Cross from 1956. He, at first, met with considerable resistance from higher authority. When permission was eventually given, it was found that the economy obtained over the single chimney A4s was from six to seven pounds of coal per mile, which more than justified the expense of the conversion.

These improvements led to greatly increased availability.

Locomotive data

The first four locomotives included the word 'silver' in their names because they were intended to haul the Silver Jubilee train. 2512 Silver Fox of this batch carried a stainless-steel fox near the centre of the streamline casing on each side, made by the Sheffield steelmakers Samuel Fox and Company. The next batch of A4s were named after birds, particularly those that were fast flyers, Gresley being a keen bird-watcher. Five (4488–92) were named after British Empire countries to haul the new Anglo-Scottish Coronation train; and two (4495/6), intended to haul the new West Riding Limited, received names connected to the wool trade: Golden Fleece and Golden Shuttle.

4498 was the hundredth Gresley Pacific to be built and was named after him. Subsequently, some other A4s were later renamed, usually to names of directors of the LNER.

 Withdrawal 

One locomotive was withdrawn and scrapped after being damaged beyond repair in a German bombing raid on York on 29 April 1942 during World War II; this was No. 4469 Sir Ralph Wedgwood, which at the time had been overhauled and was based at Gateshead. It was running local trains to run it in and was stabled in York North Shed (now the National Railway Museum) where it suffered a direct hit; however, its tender survived and was later coupled to a Thompson A2/1.

The next five withdrawals, in December 1962, were: 60003 Andrew K. McCosh, 60014 Silver Link, 60028 Walter K. Whigham, 60030 Golden Fleece and 60033 Seagull. The rest of the class was withdrawn between 1963 and 1966. The last six in service were: 60004 William Whitelaw, 60007 Sir Nigel Gresley, 60009 Union of South Africa, 60019 Bittern, 60024 Kingfisher and 60034 Lord Faringdon. 60019 and 60024 were the last to be withdrawn in September 1966.

 Preservation 
Six of the locomotives have been preserved; three of them were assigned to sheds in Scotland after the closure of King's Cross shed (34A) to steam in 1964. Four A4s are in the UK and have run on the BR main lines at some point during their preservation career. Another two (Dominion of Canada and Dwight D. Eisenhower) were donated to the Canada and the US, respectively, upon withdrawal by British Railways. Both North American-based A4s, along with the other three British-based A4s were moved to the National Railway Museum, York, in late 2012 on three-year loans as part of the NRM's 2013 celebrations of the 75th anniversary of Mallard breaking the world speed record for steam, bringing all six preserved A4s together. During 2013, 4464 'Bittern' underwent a series of high-speed runs, partly in commemoration of Mallards' record, partly to see if mainline speeds for certain heritage steam locomotives could be increased (The current maximum is 75 mph.). During the "Tyne Tees Streak" run, Bittern broke its own 91 mph speed record set just a few months prior by reaching a maximum speed of 93 mph (149.7 km/h).

From 2015 to 2020, Union of South Africa was the only A4 operational with a valid mainline certificate until it expired in 2020; 60007 was withdrawn for overhaul on 20 September 2015 and 4464 operated until the end of 2015 at the Watercress Line when it was withdrawn and placed on static display in 2018 Crewe. Union of South Africa was withdrawn in October 2021 due to boiler issues and with the coming expiration of its boiler certificate in early 2022. Sir Nigel Gresley returned to the mainline on 21 April 2022 and worked its inaugural railtour on 21 May 2022 following the completion of its major overhaul. As of 2022, 5 of 6 surviving A4's are on static display, the only working one being 60007 Sir Nigel Gresley 

Loco numbers in bold mean their current number.

Models
The distinctive shape of the A4 has made it an obvious choice for model manufacturers, with examples being made in the majority of the popular scales, including a wooden example for the Brio wooden railway. One of the first two Hornby Dublo locomotive models produced, in 1938, was an A4. In 1999 a 'Super Detail' Hornby A4 was released, later complemented by a budget 'Railroad' model Hornby also produced an 'OO'-scale live steam version in September 2003, that used an electrically heated boiler to produce steam – not previously possible in such a small model. Trix produced an 'OO' scale model A4 from 1970; it was re-branded as a Liliput model in 1974 and survives to this day in modified form as a Bachmann model – Kader, Bachmann's parent company, had bought Liliput in 1993. Dapol currently produce several versions of the A4 class in N gauge and have also expanded their Black label range to include the A4 class as well.

Notes

References

 External links 

 LNER Encyclopedia Page covering the history and development of the LNER A4 Pacifics
 Detailed list of the names, numbers and production dates of LNER A4 locomotives
 Class A4 Details at Rail UK''
 Screenshots from Elizabethan Express

Video links
 1935, Demonstration run of Silver Jubilee to Grantham
 1944, Retirement of driver Duddington

 
Land speed record rail vehicles
A4
Railway locomotives introduced in 1935
Standard gauge steam locomotives of Great Britain
Streamlined steam locomotives
4-6-2 locomotives
2′C1′ h3 locomotives
Passenger locomotives